Robert Wayne Thomas (born July 17, 1980) is a former American college and professional football player who was a linebacker in the National Football League (NFL) for seven seasons during the early 2000s.  He played college football for the University of California, Los Angeles (UCLA), and was recognized as a consensus All-American.  The St. Louis Rams picked him in the first round of the 2002 NFL Draft, and he played professionally for the Rams, Green Bay Packers and Oakland Raiders of the NFL.

Early years
Thomas was born in El Centro, California.  He was raised in a family with three brothers and a sister.  He graduated from Imperial High School in Imperial, California, where he played for the Imperial Tigers high school football team.  Thomas' older brother Stan was an offensive tackle in the NFL for four seasons during the 1990s.

Robert was on an episode of Guts as a 13 year old where he beat 12 year old Tony and an 11 year old girl. He dominated after Tony took a “digger” according to Mike O Malley.

College career
Thomas attended University of California, Los Angeles, where he was a history major and played for the UCLA Bruins football team from 1998 to 2001.  As a freshman in 1998, he was a reserve inside linebacker making 26 tackles (two for losses), and playing in all 12 games.  Thomas became a regular starter as a sophomore, and had 68 tackles despite missing three games.  Following his 2000 junior season, he was named UCLA's Defensive Most Valuable Player and was a second-team All-Pac-10 selection after leading the team with 88 tackles (nine for losses) and six forced fumbles.  As a senior in 2001, Thomas led the Bruins with 111 tackles (26 for a loss) and had 6.5 sacks, forced two fumbles and defensed five passes.  He was a first-team All-Pac-10 selection and the Pac-10 Defensive Player of the Year, and was recognized as a consensus first-team All-American in 2001.

Awards and honors
 Second-team All-Pac-10 (2000)
 Butkus Award semifinalist (2000)
 First-team All-Pac-10 (2001)
 Pac-10 Defensive Player of the Year (2001)
 Consensus first-team All-American (2001)
 Butkus Award finalist (2001)
 Lombardi Award semifinalist (2001)

Professional career

Pre-draft

St. Louis Rams
He was drafted by the St. Louis Rams 31st overall in the 2002 NFL Draft. On July 22, 2002, Thomas signed a five-year $5.75 million contract with the Rams. Thomas started 30 games during his three seasons in St. Louis while totaling 163 tackles in those games.

Green Bay Packers
St. Louis traded Thomas to the Green Bay Packers at the end of training camp on September 4, 2005, for cornerback Chris Johnson.  Thomas started nine games at weak-side linebacker  in 2005. On May 2, 2006, the Packers released Thomas.

Oakland Raiders
On August 24, 2006 Thomas signed with Oakland Raiders, and he played in all 16 games in 2006, with no starts. On February 24, 2007, the Raiders re-signed Thomas, who was eligible to be a free agent. The deal included $1.5 million signing bonus and a $1.5 million salary for 2007 and $2 million in salary in 2008. He started 10 games for the Raiders in 2007 but appeared in just two in 2008 before suffering a season-ending hamstring injury against the Atlanta Falcons on November 2, 2008.

Washington Redskins
On April 9, 2009, the Redskins signed Thomas to a one-year $1.3 million contract. He was released by the Redskins after the final preseason game on September 9, 2009.

NFL statistics

References

External links
 Official Website
 Green Bay Packers bio
 Oakland Raiders bio
 UCLA Bruins bio
 Washington Redskins bio

1980 births
Living people
All-American college football players
American football linebackers
Green Bay Packers players
Oakland Raiders players
People from El Centro, California
St. Louis Rams players
UCLA Bruins football players
Washington Redskins players
Players of American football from California
Sportspeople from Southern California